Arda Dadaja is a settlement in Kenya's Mandera County.

History 
In the colonial period, a road connected Arda Dadaja to Italian Somaliland.

Before the Kenyan general election in 2013, Arda Dadaja voted as part of the North Eastern Province.

References 

Populated places in North Eastern Province (Kenya)